Bokermannohyla ibitiguara is a species of frog in the family Hylidae.
It is endemic to Alpinópolis and Serra da Canastra, Brazil.
Its natural habitats are moist savanna and rivers.
It is threatened by habitat loss for agriculture, human settlement, tourism and fires.

References

Bokermannohyla
Endemic fauna of Brazil
Amphibians described in 1983
Taxonomy articles created by Polbot